Dag Vågsås (born 17 May 1954) is a Norwegian actor, instructor and choreographer. 

He has had a varied career in Norwegian culture, with many roles in theatre, TV and film - in comedies, Farces, musicals, and mostly, in revues. He has also worked a lot in children's entertainment, for example, the Christmas show on Putti Plutti Pott and stories on Den lille traktoren Gråtass. He has also read audiobooks and had vocal roles in Norwegian versions of foreign children's films.

Dag Vågsås sits on the panel of Norsk Revyforfatter-forening and has for many years been a part of ABC-teateret and Chat Noir in Oslo. He has also written many articles and essays on film and musicals.

References

External links
 

1954 births
Living people
Norwegian male stage actors
Norwegian male dancers
Norwegian choreographers
Norwegian male film actors
Norwegian male television actors